The Human Be-In was an event held in San Francisco's Golden Gate Park Polo Fields on January 14, 1967. It was a prelude to San Francisco's Summer of Love, which made the Haight-Ashbury district a symbol of American counterculture and introduced the word "psychedelic" to suburbia.

Origins

Counterculture
The Human Be-In focused the key ideas of the 1960s counterculture: personal empowerment, cultural and political decentralization, communal living, ecological awareness, higher consciousness (with the aid of psychedelic drugs), acceptance of illicit psychedelics use, and radical New Left political consciousness. The hippie movement developed out of disaffected student communities around San Francisco State University, City College and Berkeley and in San Francisco's beat generation poets and jazz hipsters, who also combined a search for intuitive spontaneity with a rejection of "middle-class morality". Allen Ginsberg personified the transition between the beat and hippie generations.

Protests

The Human Be-In took its name from a chance remark by the artist Michael Bowen made at the Love Pageant Rally. The playful name combined humanist values with the scores of sit-ins that had been reforming college and university practices and eroding the vestiges of entrenched segregation, starting with the lunch counter sit-ins of 1960 in Greensboro, North Carolina, and Nashville, Tennessee. The first major teach-in had been organized by Students for a Democratic Society at the University of Michigan, 24–25 March 1965.

Event
The Human Be-In was announced on the cover of the fifth issue of the San Francisco Oracle as "A Gathering of the Tribes for a Human Be-In". The occasion was a new California law banning the use of the psychedelic drug LSD that had come into effect on October 6, 1966. The speakers at the rally were all invited by Bowen, the main organizer. They included  Timothy Leary in his first San Francisco appearance, who set the tone that afternoon with his famous phrase "Turn on, tune in, drop out" and Richard Alpert (soon to be known as "Ram Dass"), and poets like Allen Ginsberg, who chanted mantras, Gary Snyder and Michael McClure. Other counterculture gurus included comedian Dick Gregory, Lenore Kandel, Lawrence Ferlinghetti, Jerry Rubin, and Alan Watts. Music was provided by a host of local rock bands including Jefferson Airplane, The Grateful Dead, Big Brother and the Holding Company, Quicksilver Messenger Service, and Blue Cheer, most of whom had been staples of the Fillmore and the Avalon Ballroom. "Underground chemist" Owsley Stanley provided massive amounts of his "White Lightning" LSD, specially produced for the event, as well as 75  turkeys, for free distribution by the Diggers.

The national media were stunned, publicity about this event leading to the mass movement of young people from all over America to descend on the Haight-Ashbury area. Reports were unable to agree whether 20,000 or 30,000 people showed up at the Be-In. Soon every gathering was an "-In" of some kind: Just four weeks later was Bob Fass's Human Fly-In, then the Love-In (March 26, 1967 at Elysian Park, Los Angeles), the Emmett Grogan inspired Sweep-In, Rowan and Martin's Laugh-In comedy television show began airing over NBC just a year later on January 22, 1968. This was followed by the first "Yip-In" (March 21, 1968, at Grand Central Terminal), another "Love-In" (April 14, 1968, at Malibu Canyon) and, John Lennon and Yoko Ono's "Bed-In" (March 25, 1969, in Amsterdam).

The Human Be-In was later recalled by poet Allen Cohen (who assisted the artist Bowen in the organizational work,) as a meld that brought together philosophically opposed factions of the San Francisco-based counterculture at the time: on one side, the Berkeley radicals, who were tending toward increased militancy in response to the U.S. government's Vietnam war policies, and, on the other side, the rather non-political Haight-Ashbury hippies, who urged peaceful protest. Their means were drastically different, but they held many of the same goals.

According to Cohen's own account, his friend Bowen provided much of the "organizing energy" for the event, and Bowen's personal connections also strongly influenced its character.

Legacy
The counterculture that surfaced at the "Human Be-In" encouraged people to "question authority" with regard to civil rights, women's rights, and consumer rights. Underground newspapers and radio stations served as its alternative media.

A Human Be-In was put on in Denver, Colorado in July 1967 by Chet Helms and Barry Fey to harness the energy of the famed San Francisco event that occurred in January and promote their new Family Dog Productions venue, The Family Dog Denver. The event attracted 5,000 people and featured performances by the Grateful Dead, Odetta and Captain Beefheart. Timothy Leary and Ken Kesey were said to have also been in attendance.

The Be-In later spawned a series of Digital Be-Ins.

A UK theatre company, Theatre 14167, (also 14167 films)  takes its name from the date of the Be-In; the company subsequently produced work by Michael McClure, who read at the event.

See also
Bed-In
Central Park be-in
Counterculture of the 1960s
Teach-in
Timeline of 1960s counterculture

References

Notes

Further reading

External links
Human Be-In 50th Anniversary
Allen Cohen's website, with history from an insider.
Haight-Ashbury in the 1960s 'Rockument' commentary and sound bites.
1967 Berkeley Poster for 'Pow-Wow: A Gathering of the Tribes for a Human Be-In'
Loren Sears' Human Be-In film at 'The Diggers Archive'

Counterculture festivals
Festivals in California
Golden Gate Park
Haight-Ashbury, San Francisco
Hippie movement
History of San Francisco
Opposition to United States involvement in the Vietnam War
1967 in California
January 1967 events in the United States
1967 in the United States
1960s in San Francisco